Secret Shine are a British indie band formed in the early 1990s, who were signed to Sarah Records. Their early releases with Sarah and A Turntable Friend followed a pop style, before the band went in a more shoegaze direction with the 1992 release Untouched, triggering comparisons with Slowdive and My Bloody Valentine.

Career

1990 to 1996
The group originally formed under the name Amelia's Dream. After sending a three-song demo to Sarah Records, Scott Purnell and Jamie Gingell recorded their first single for the label, "After Years". After recruiting three more members (Nick Dyte, Dean Purnell, and Paul Vowles) they recorded "Unbearable", a single for the German label A Turntable Friend. The addition of Dean Tyler to the lineup was followed by the single "Ephemeral" on Sarah. Later, Purnell and Gingell recorded some demos that became the Untouched album.

In 1993 the album was recorded and released, along with the single "Loveblind". The addition of vocalist Kathryn Smith saw the band enter the Indie charts and become part of the emerging shoegaze scene. At that point, the band took a hiatus as Purnell and Gingell returned to complete their final year of university, but the band subsequently reformed and recorded the Greater than God EP.

After the recording of the Each to the Other flexidisc, Dean Tyler left the band, followed by Nick Dyte. Tim Morris joined on drums, the rest of the lineup being Jamie Gingell (vocals and bass), Scott Purnell (guitars), Dean Purnell (guitars), and Kathryn Smith (vocals). The next single, "Wasted Away", was released on Spoiler Records as Sarah had recently folded. After playing a gig in Oxford in early 1996, the band decided to stop, though they never officially split.

2004 to Present
In 2004, a retrospective collection called After Years was released by the Tonevendor label, containing all their Sarah material (apart from the first single, and including the Untouched album), which became a catalyst for the band reforming. Around this time, Tim Morris died, and the band reformed to record an acoustic eight-track tribute record, Morris.

Another album, All of The Stars, was released on 8 April 2008, followed by The Beginning and the End on 5 January 2011.

In October 2014 Secret Shine signed with shoegaze and dream pop record label Saint Marie Records. The next full-length album, There Is Only Now, was released on 17 March 2017.

On 25 June 2020 the band self-released a new single Ember. In an interview around that time the band said that this was intended to be the first of five single releases during 2020-2021 that would be form the basis of a new album in 2021, to mark the band's 30th anniversary.

Discography

Albums

EPs

Singles

Tracks on Compilations

References

External links
Official Bandcamp page https://secretshine.bandcamp.com/music 
Band MySpace page
[ Secret Shine on Allmusic]
Sarah Records entry
OpusZine review

Musical groups established in 1991
Musical groups disestablished in 1996
Musical groups reestablished in 2004
Musical groups disestablished in 2007
English indie rock groups
British shoegaze musical groups
Dream pop musical groups
Sarah Records artists
1991 establishments in England
Musical groups from Bristol
2004 establishments in England